Katherine Greacen Nelson (December 9, 1913 – December 29, 1982), born in Sierra Madre, California, was an American geologist. She was one of the first women to receive a degree in geology, obtaining a PhD from Rutgers University. Growing up in a military family exposed to nature and traveling at an early age, Nelson showed an eagerness for geology by devoting her days to learning the various geological processes that encompass the earth, eventually winning a prize for an excellence in geology from Vassar College. She was later hired by Milwaukee-Downer College as part of college's expanding geological and geographical sciences department eventually leaving her position in 1943 to help as a petroleum geologist as part of the war effort. Nelson went on to give many lectures that helped inspire students of all genders towards the field of geography and geology. She died in December 1982 at the age of 69 in Milwaukee, Wisconsin after a long battle with cancer. Nelson is survived by her husband, Attorney Frank Hubert Nelson, her brother Robert A. Greacen, and thousands of loving friends and former students all over the world.

Career and education 

Katherine Greacen Nelson received her Bachelor of Science from Vassar College in 1934, being acknowledged for her excellence in geology. Katherine wrote several papers but was best known for the time she devoted teaching students about Earth, bussing kids down to the Greene Museum with the thought of a possible Ice Age Scientific Reserve in Wisconsin. Four years after graduating from Vassar, Nelson attended Rutgers University and became one of the first women to earn a PhD in geology. Nelson went directly into teaching at Milwaukee-Downer College, as well as being the curator at the Thomas A. Greene Memorial Museum. During World War II, Nelson left teaching and began working in petroleum geology and paleontology working for Shell Oil Co. (later transitioning to Hunt Oil Co.) as a way to help out with the war effort. At the end of WWII, she returned to Milwaukee-Downer College to continue teaching in both geology and geography. During her time teaching there she also spent time teaching at the Milwaukee-Downer Seminary and YWCA. In 1954 when the school merged with Lawrence College (under the name UW–Milwaukee), Nelson decided to once again leave Milwaukee-Downer College. In 1956 the University of Wisconsin–Milwaukee obtained the Milwaukee-Downer campus. Due to her heavy involvement in both the museum and university, Nelson took the initiative to purchase the Greene Museum from Milwaukee-Downer. She created an active public education program for the less wealthy where more than 20,000 people have benefited from its teachings. In this same year, Nelson was named the first faculty member and chair of the Department of Geological & Geophysical Sciences at the University of Wisconsin–Milwaukee. In 1978 Katherine was selected as the first woman to ever accept the prestigious Neil Miner award for her contribution the earth science. Nelson continued to be a part of the Governing board of the academy as well as being a nominee for the Earth Science Section of the American Association for the Advancement of Science until her death on December 29, 1982.

Influence as a female geologist 

As the first women to graduate with a PhD in geology from Rutgers University, Nelson made many fundamental contributions in her field. Therefore, she received numerous awards, including the Midwest Federation of Mineralogical & Geological Societies Educator of the Year Award in 1982, while working as a professor at University of Wisconsin–Milwaukee. At the time of Nelson's death she was one of the first women ever nominated for the Presidency of Chapter E in the latter society. In addition, she was the first woman to receive the Neil Milner Award in 1978 for making prestigious contributions to earth science education. She also acquired the position of first female president of the Wisconsin Academy of Sciences, Arts, & Letters in the year 1952 to 1953. As a result of the assistance she provided, she was chosen as an honorary curator at the Milwaukee Public Museum. Nelson's influences towards education are more significant compared to her research or findings as a geologist; Nelson purchased the Greene Museum from Milwaukee-Downer and put together a public teaching program that gave more than 20,000 people the opportunity to learn from her, Nelson had major influences on others lives through her teachings. However, Nelsons teachings and research findings as a geologist are equally as essential to geology as a whole. As a result, The Nelson Award was created to honor her contributions to education in the field of geology. She was a great advocate for making women as a whole more prevalent in the world of geology, this was done throughout all of the research and teachings Nelson had conducted throughout her career. Nelson was a woman of great knowledge and influenced others to always work towards expanding their understanding of our world.

Community work 

Nelson was invested in helping out the general population throughout the entirety of her career. She believed that everyone should gain a basic understanding of their surroundings and appreciate the wonder of geological processes. Nelson accomplished this by putting a great amount of effort and detail into presenting public lectures to inquisitive minds; Nelson educated more than 20,000 students because of the knowledge she provided to the open minds around her. This also included acting as a tour guide to students when visiting museums and offering information about the field, believing that her work should stem past college-education. She became deeply entrenched in the media by freely writing many newspaper articles as well as giving media interviews. She was devoted to helping geology hobbyists in their range of work by offering her knowledge to everyone. She was influential in the area of preserving glaciers as she explained the importance of Wisconsin's glacial feature to politicians, which would later lead to the establishment of the National Ice Age Scientific Reserve. Throughout all of this, Nelson inspired a new generation of geological interest in students.

Public image 
Nelson was a well-respected geologist and teacher who was equally dedicated to both the students she taught and to the science she loved. Her passion for geology and her desire to share that passion left a lasting impact on the study of geology and is one of the many reasons she was so widely loved. She is known for her work towards the progression of earth sciences and was recently recognized by the Geological Society of America as one of the pioneers for woman in geology in the United States of America. Her studies within the geological world are truly remarkable but the long-lasting influence she had on her students is what many remember her for. She is described as a kind, warm, and enthusiastic individual of whom students spoke highly. Nelson did none of her work for pay, instead choosing to teach for free out of a passion for the science and a drive to educate any willing to listen.  

As a teacher her objective was to help students acknowledge and appreciate the world around them, putting a focus on the understanding of topics such as geological processes and the concept of time. She especially enjoyed taking her students out into the field to learn about the environment first hand. She hosted public lectures and gave museum tours to children with the goal of exposing as many people as possible to geology. She could be found teaching school children about minerals and other facets of the science. 

In 1982 she was named Educator of the Year by the Midwest Federation of Mineralogical and Geological Societies due to her many contributions to the geological community. At the time of her death, she was a nominee for president of Chapter E. She was also president of the Wisconsin Academy of Sciences, Arts, and Letters in 1952-53 making her the first female president of this organization. 

On January 15, 1983 Katherines colleagues honoured her life by hosting a paleontological symposium that featured the work from several of her students. Papers of her students were published in a specialized memorial volume of Transactions of the Wisconsin Academy of Sciences, Arts, and Literature. Her department named and created a scholarship to honouring her.

References 

1913 births
1982 deaths
University of Wisconsin–Milwaukee faculty
20th-century American geologists
Milwaukee-Downer College faculty
Fellows of the American Association for the Advancement of Science
People from Los Angeles